Macedonians in Austria refers to the ethnic Macedonian minority residing in the country. Thousands of Macedonians emigrated to Austria during the years of the Yugoslav federation. Many were temporary workers. After the Breakup of Yugoslavia many returned to North Macedonia, but a large proportion of the minority remained. In recent years migration to Austria has increased. By 2001 there were 13,696 Macedonian citizens in Austria, however the Macedonian government puts the figure at 15,000. A community spokesperson however estimated the figure to be over 25,000 people, claiming many Macedonians from other parts of the former Yugoslavia were also present in Austria.

Notable people

References

See also 
Austria–North Macedonia relations
Macedonian people
Macedonian language
Republic of North Macedonia
Macedonian diaspora

Austria
Macedonian